The Byzantine–Lombard wars were a protracted series of conflicts which occurred from AD 568 to 750 between the Byzantine Empire and a Germanic tribe known as the Lombards. The wars began primarily because of the imperialistic inclinations of the Lombard king Alboin, as he sought to take possession of Northern Italy. The conflicts ended in a Byzantine defeat, as the Lombards were able to secure large parts of Northern Italy at first, eventually conquering the Exarchate of Ravenna in 750.

Invasion of Northern Italy
The Lombards began the invasion of Northern Italy on Easter Monday, 568. The Lombards chose this date to ensure that the migrations were to be undertaken through the guidance of their gods. The Lombards migrated into Italy whilst fighting meagre resistance from the Byzantine border forces known as the Milites Limitanei, which were remnants from the Imperial Roman military organisation. The Lombards managed to annex Northern Italy quickly. Cividale del Friuli, the first town to be captured, was established as the capital of the Duchy of Friuli, with Alboin's nephew Gisulf reigning as its first Duke. Following the immediate success of the invasion of Northern Italy and the capture of Friuli, the Lombards began to turn eastward towards Venice. The army captured Aquileia, before undertaking many acts of destruction against the population of the city, leading many civilians to migrate to other areas in Southern Italy.

References

Citations

Bibliography

 

 

Lombards
Kingdom of the Lombards
Exarchate of Ravenna